Gojčin is a village in the municipalities of Osmaci (Republika Srpska) and Kalesija, Bosnia and Herzegovina.

Demographics 
According to the 2013 census, its population was 540, with 119 of them living in the Osmaci part and 421 in the Kalesija part.

References

Populated places in Kalesija
Populated places in Osmaci